The Falling is a 2014 British mystery drama film written and directed by Carol Morley. It stars Maisie Williams and Florence Pugh (in her first film appearance) as best friends at an all-girls school. The film also stars Greta Scacchi, Monica Dolan, Maxine Peake, and Mathew Baynton. Production began in October 2013. The film premiered at the BFI London Film Festival on 11 October 2014 and was released theatrically on 24 April 2015 in the UK.

Plot 
In 1969, Lydia and Abbie are best friends at an English girls' school. Lydia, the neglected daughter of an agoraphobic mother, becomes fixated on Abbie, who has begun to explore her sexuality. After having sex with Lydia's brother Kenneth in an attempt to abort her pregnancy by another boy, Abbie begins to suffer from fainting spells. She faints and goes into convulsions after a stint in detention with Lydia and dies in the process. Following Abbie's burial, Lydia begins suffering as well from fainting spells, and it soon becomes an epidemic, with numerous girls and a young teacher in the school spontaneously passing out for no more than a few seconds. Lydia becomes convinced that the administration must take action, much to the chagrin of the school principal.

When an assembly becomes disrupted by a mass fainting episode, the school is temporarily shut down and all affected students are hospitalised and psychoanalysed. When no cause for the spells is discovered, the school is reopened and Lydia is expelled. That same night, the virginal Lydia has sex with her brother Kenneth, with whom she has developed an incestuous attraction after Abbie's death. Their mother, Eileen, catches them, however, and, armed with a pair of scissors, angrily forces Kenneth out of the house before launching into a tirade against her daughter, in which she brands Lydia dangerous and says that she ought to be locked up. Eileen then reveals that Lydia and Kenneth are only half-siblings, in that Lydia was the product of her rape by a stranger.

Upon learning this, Lydia runs out of the house and Eileen follows her outside, despite having never ventured outside in over 16 years. Searching for Lydia, Eileen is overcome with flashbacks of her own sexual assault. She eventually locates Lydia, who has climbed to the top of a tree in a breakdown over Abbie's death. Eileen pleads with Lydia to come down, but she laughs, challenging her mother's lack of maternal affection, before losing her footing and falling from the tree into a lake.

Distraught, Eileen ventures into the water, finds Lydia's seemingly drowned body, and cradles her apparently dead daughter, realising that her emotional frigidity had done more harm to her daughter than she knew. Lydia unexpectedly regains consciousness, and the film ends with the two women in a crying embrace.

Cast 
 Maisie Williams as Lydia Lamont
 Maxine Peake as Eileen Lamb
 Monica Dolan as Miss Alvaro
 Greta Scacchi as Miss Mantel
 Mathew Baynton as Mr Hopkins
 Florence Pugh as Abigail Mortimer
 Joe Cole as Kenneth Lamont
 Morfydd Clark as Pamela Charron
 Lauren McCrostie as Gwen
 Hannah Rose Caton as Titch

Production 
BFI funded the film £750K. Production began in October 2013.  The soundtrack is by Tracey Thorn. Morley asked Thorn to provide the music for the film after editing had begun.

Release 
The Falling premiered at the BFI London Film Festival on 11 October 2014. It had a limited release in the United Kingdom, grossing £442,177 with a further £10,051 grossed in New Zealand. US DVD sales amounted to another £6,406.

Reception 
Rotten Tomatoes, a review aggregator, reports that 73% of 37 surveyed critics gave the film a positive review; the average rating is 6.8/10.  The site’s consensus states, “Well-acted and overall unsettling, The Falling delivers thought-provoking thrills -- and suggests a bright future for writer-director Carol Morley.” Mark Adams of Screen International wrote, "It is a film that will resonate with some but leave others exasperated, but The Falling is certainly a bold film, and one to be admired and appreciated."  Guy Lodge of Variety called it "an imperfect but alluring study of psychological contagion that marks an auspicious advance in the field of narrative filmmaking for acclaimed documaker Carol Morley". Leslie Felperin of The Hollywood Reporter called it "a flawed but fascinating period study of female friendship and hysteria".  Trevor Johnston of Time Out London rated it 4/5 stars and wrote, "Carol Morley shows startling versatility and ambition with this jawdropping mash-up of If... and Picnic at Hanging Rock".  Mike McCahill of The Daily Telegraph rated it 4/5 stars and called it a continuation of the themes in Nicolas Roeg's Performance and Don't Look Now.

Geoffrey Macnab of The Independent rated it 4/5 stars and wrote, "Carol Morley's The Falling is beguiling and disturbing, a beautifully made and very subtle affair that combines melodrama, rites of passage and supernatural elements in an utterly intriguing way." Peter Bradshaw of The Guardian rated it 5/5 stars and wrote, "Director Carol Morley has come up with another brilliant and very distinctive feature, about an epidemic of fainting that grips a girls school in the 1960s." Elise Nakhnikian of Slant Magazine gave a less favourable review, writing that "the film all leads to a melodramatic climax that wraps up the main character's explosive acting out in a too-neat package." David Jenkins of Little White Lies also gave an unfavourable review, writing, "Carol Morley follows up the mesmerising Dreams of a Life with a tedious period drama set in an all-girls school."

Awards

See also  
 Mass psychogenic illness
 HELLP syndrome

References

External links 
 

2014 films
2014 LGBT-related films
2010s coming-of-age drama films
2010s mystery drama films
2010s teen drama films
Agoraphobia in fiction
British coming-of-age drama films
British LGBT-related films
British high school films
British mystery drama films
British teen drama films
Films about death
Films about dysfunctional families
Films about virginity
Films set in 1969
Incest in film
Juvenile sexuality in films
Teenage pregnancy in film
2010s high school films
Lesbian-related films
Bisexuality-related films
Films about siblings
2014 drama films
2010s female buddy films
2010s English-language films
2010s British films